Abzal is a given name. Notable people with the name include:

Abzal Azhgaliyev (born 1992), Kazakh speed skater
Abzal Beysebekov (born 1992), Kazakh footballer
Abzal Dean (born 1983), Canadian cricketer
Abzal Rakimgaliev (born 1992), Kazakh figure skater
Abzal Zhumabaev (born 1986), Kazakh footballer